Mark Anthony Proctor (born 15 January 1963) is a male British former athlete who competed in the 2000 Summer Olympics. He was born in Wenhaston, Suffolk.

He represented England in the shot put event, at the 1998 Commonwealth Games in Kuala Lumpur, Malaysia. He then appeared at the next two Commonwealth Games in 2002 and 2006.

Competition record

References

1963 births
Living people
People from Suffolk Coastal (district)
British male shot putters
English male shot putters
Olympic athletes of Great Britain
Athletes (track and field) at the 2000 Summer Olympics
Commonwealth Games competitors for England
Athletes (track and field) at the 1998 Commonwealth Games
Athletes (track and field) at the 2002 Commonwealth Games
Athletes (track and field) at the 2006 Commonwealth Games
World Athletics Championships athletes for Great Britain